Grevillea scapigera, commonly known as Corrigin grevillea, is a species of flowering plant in the family Proteaceae and is endemic to a small area of the south-west of Western Australia. It is a prostrate to weakly ascending, suckering shrub with divided leaves, the end lobes broadly triangular and sharply-pointed, and spikes of white to cream-coloured flowers held above the foliage.

Description
The end lobes are broadly triangular and sharply-pointed. Both surfaces of the leaves are glabrous when mature, sometimes glaucous, have a slightly leathery texture, and have slightly thickened edges. The flowers are sweetly-scented, green at first, turning white to cream-coloured as they open, with a white style, the pollen presenter greenish.

TaxonomyGrevillea scapigera was first formally described by the botanist Alexander Segger George in 1974 in the journal Nuytsia, from specimens collected between Corrigin and Quairading by Clive Vincent Malcolm in 1960. The specific epithet (scapigera) means "flower-stalk bearing".

Distribution and habitat
Corrigin grevillea is found in a small area centred around the town of Corrigin from south of Quairading in the west to about halfway between Corrigin and Kwolyin in the north out as far as Hyden in the east and about halfway between Corrigin and Yealering in the south. It is mostly found growing in gravelly to sandy lateritic soils.

Conservation statusGrevillea scapigera is listed as "endangered" under the Australian Government Environment Protection and Biodiversity Conservation Act 1999'' and as "threatened" by the Western Australian Government Department of Biodiversity, Conservation and Attractions. The main threats to the species include its lack of critical habitat, habitat fragmentation, seed predation, weed invasion, browsing by rabbits, and salinity.

See also
List of Grevillea species

References

scapigera
Eudicots of Western Australia
Proteales of Australia
Plants described in 1974
Taxa named by Alex George